The German Tennis Federation (German: Deutscher Tennis Bund, short form: DTB) is the governing body of tennis federations and clubs in Germany.

It is the largest tennis federation in the world with more than 1,800,000 members.

Founded on 19 May 1902 in Berlin as the Deutscher Lawn Tennis Bund (DLTB) it is one of the oldest sport federations of the world. Its first president was Carl August von der Meden between 1902 and 1911.

In 1933, it passed a resolution stating that: "No Jew may be selected for a national team or the Davis Cup. No Jewish or Marxist club or association may be affiliated with the German Tennis Federation. The player Dr. Prenn (a Jew) will not be selected for the Davis Cup team in 1933."

It organises the International German Open at the Hamburger Rothenbaum, the Davis Cup and Fed Cup home matches.

See also
 Tennis in Germany

References

External links 

 Official website of the German Tennis Federation

Germany
Tennis in Germany
Tennis
1902 establishments in Germany